Paracles peruensis is a moth of the subfamily Arctiinae first described by Paul Dognin in 1907. It is found in Peru.

References

Moths described in 1907
Paracles